Claudio Valenzuela (born June 10, 1969 in Santiago, Chile) is a guitarist, singer, and composer. He is most known as the lead-singer and guitarist of Chilean rock band Lucybell. Formed in 1991, Valenzuela is the only original member and the main composer of the band, as the line-up shifted over the years. Lucybell has released 7 studio albums.

In 2009 Claudio Valenzuela released his first solo album, Gemini. Released on the Accidental Muzik label, and produced by Adam Moseley, the album explores the themes of life, love, and death, and is bilingual (Spanish and English).  Gemini was released in Mexico and the U.S. in 2010 and supported with tours in both countries.

References

1969 births
Living people
20th-century Chilean male singers
21st-century Chilean male singers
Chilean male guitarists
Chilean rock singers
Chilean singer-songwriters
Musicians from Santiago
Singers from Santiago
20th-century Chilean male artists